Mafalda Martins da Silva Luís de Castro (Mafalda Luís de Castro or just Mafalda de Castro for short) is a Portuguese actress who acts out on Portuguese television programs that air on TVI and a few on SIC. She is also a voice actress, who voiced and dubbed characters in European Portuguese, mostly young and/or royal female characters.

She is the official European Portuguese dub-over artist for British actress, Emma Watson, since she voiced her role as Hermione Granger throughout the Harry Potter films and the video game adaptations.

Filmography

Television

She is an actress on CMTV's soap opera "Someone Lost" playing Leonor Mascarenhas.

Voice Roles

Video Games
Harry Potter and the Philosopher's Stone (video game) - Hermione Granger
Harry Potter and the Chamber of Secrets (video game) - Hermione Granger
Harry Potter and the Prisoner of Azkaban (video game) - Hermione Granger
Harry Potter and the Goblet of Fire (video game) - Hermione Granger
Harry Potter and the Order of the Phoenix (video game) - Hermione Granger
Harry Potter and the Half-Blood Prince (video game) - Hermione Granger
Harry Potter and the Deathly Hallows – Part 1 (video game) - Hermione Granger
Harry Potter and the Deathly Hallows – Part 2 (video game) - Hermione Granger

Dubbing Roles

Live Action Films
Harry Potter and the Philosopher's Stone (film) - Hermione Granger (Emma Watson)
Harry Potter and the Chamber of Secrets (film) - Hermione Granger (Emma Watson)
Harry Potter and the Prisoner of Azkaban (film) - Hermione Granger (Emma Watson)
Harry Potter and the Goblet of Fire (film) - Hermione Granger (Emma Watson)
 - Vanessa (Sarah Kim Gries)
Mirror Mirror - Snow White (Lily Collins)

Animated Films
Barbie as the Island Princess -
The Tale of Despereaux - Princess Pea (replacing Emma Watson's voice)
Battle for Terra - 
Hop - Samantha "Sam" O'Hare (replacing Kaley Cuoco's voice) (Live action and Animation)
The Smurfs - One of the Smurf characters (Live action and Animation)
Arthur Christmas -

Animated Series
Kitty Is Not a Cat - Kitty (Roslyn Oades) (Lauren Tom)

References

External links
 

Year of birth missing (living people)
Place of birth missing (living people)
Portuguese voice actresses
Living people
Actresses from Lisbon
Portuguese television actresses
21st-century Portuguese actresses